Wandflower is a common name for several plants and may refer to:

Dierama
Galax
Gaura
Sparaxis tricolor